The Dungeon is a  Site of Special Scientific Interest (SSSI) situated 1 mile north-west of Heswall, on the Wirral Peninsula, England. The site was notified in 1988 due to its geological features which show the Tarporley Siltstone Formation of the Mercia Mudstone Group.

References
Natural England citation sheet

External links
Metropolitan Borough of Wirral: The Dungeon (SSSI)

Sites of Special Scientific Interest in Merseyside
Sites of Special Scientific Interest notified in 1987